Lithuanian broadcaster LRT announced their participation for Junior Eurovision Song Contest 2008. The National Final, "Mažųjų žvaigždžių ringas" chose Eglė Jurgaitytė to represent Lithuania in the Junior Eurovision Song Contest 2008.

Before Junior Eurovision

Mažųjų žvaigždžių ringas 
The national selection show Mažųjų žvaigždžių ringas consisted of four semi-finals held between 6 and 27 September 2008 and a final held on 5 October 2008.

In the semi-finals, the songs first faced a public televote where the winner qualified. A three-member jury panel then selected an additional two qualifiers from the remaining entries to proceed to the final. Four wildcard finalists were also selected from each semi-final out of the remaining non-qualifying acts. In the final, the winner was determined by a 50/50 combination of votes from a five-member jury panel and public televoting.

Semi-final 1
The first semi-final was held on 6 September 2008. Three entries qualified to the final. The six competing entries first faced a public televote where the winning song advanced. An additional qualifier was selected from the remaining five entries by the jury. A wildcard act was also selected from the remaining non-qualifying acts to proceed to the final. The members of the jury consisted of Aistė Pilvelytė, Vytautas Miškinis and Ara Veberis.

Semi-final 2
The second semi-final was held on 13 September 2008. Three entries qualified to the final. The six competing entries first faced a public televote where the winning song advanced. An additional qualifier was selected from the remaining five entries by the jury. A wildcard act was also selected from the remaining non-qualifying acts to proceed to the final. The members of the jury consisted of Andrius Borisevičius, Julija Ritčik and Vaidas Baumila.

Semi-final 3
The third semi-final was held on 20 September 2008. Three entries qualified to the final. The six competing entries first faced a public televote where the winning song advanced. An additional qualifier was selected from the remaining five entries by the jury. A wildcard act was also selected from the remaining non-qualifying acts to proceed to the final. The members of the jury consisted of Augustė, Laurynas Šarkinas and Steponas Januška.

Semi-final 4
The fourth semi-final was held on 27 September 2008. Three entries qualified to the final. The seven competing entries first faced a public televote where the winning song advanced. An additional qualifier was selected from the remaining six entries by the jury. A wildcard act was also selected from the remaining non-qualifying acts to proceed to the final. The members of the jury consisted of Artūras Novikas, Andrius Glušakovas and Marius Matulevičius.

Final
The final was held on 5 October 2008 at the LRT TV Studios in Vilnius, where 12 participants competed. The winner was chosen by televoting (50%) and a five-member "expert" jury (50%). The members of the jury consisted of Rosita Čivilytė, Eva, Tomas Sinickis, Saulius Urbonavičius and Darius Užkuraitis.

At Junior Eurovision

Voting

Notes

References

Junior Eurovision Song Contest
Junior
Lithuania